The 1932 Missouri lieutenant gubernatorial election was held on November 8, 1932. Democratic nominee Frank Gaines Harris defeated Republican nominee James J. Barrett with 62.13% of the vote.

Primary elections
Primary elections were held on August 2, 1932.

Democratic primary

Candidates
Frank Gaines Harris, former State Senator
Floyd Sperry
Alvin O'Connor
Fred M. Harris

Results

Republican primary

Candidates
James J. Barrett
J. Grant Frye
David P. Janes
Keith McCanse
Louis E. Trieseler

Results

General election

Candidates
Major party candidates
Frank Gaines Harris, Democratic
James J. Barrett, Republican

Other candidates
George C. Grant, Socialist
Monroe Jones, Communist
Theodore Baeff, Socialist Labor

Results

References

1932
Gubernatorial
Missouri